Kumatakenin is an O-methylated flavonol. It can be found in Astragalus membranaceus.

References 

O-methylated flavonols